The Expedition of the Col des Beni Aïcha in May 1837, during the French conquest of Algeria, pitted the troupes coloniales under Colonel Maximilien Joseph Schauenburg against the troops of Beni Aïcha of the Igawawen.

Historical Context

This expedition was started in May 1837 from Algiers to the city of Constantine via the mountain range of Khachna in Kabylia.

The treaty effectively recognized the control of the Emirate of Abdelkader over a large part of the interior area of what is now Algeria.

Emir Abdekader exploited this treaty to assert his power over the tribes throughout the interior of the country, building new towns far from French control with a rigorous administration.

He worked especially in Kabylia and elsewhere to raise the Muslim population under French control to resist by both peaceful and military means their possession.

This desire of Emir Abdelkader to face the French again, even after signing the treaty, led him to claim under this pact all the territory east of  among the Kabyles of Beni Aïcha and which in fact included the main road between Algiers and Constantine.

Raid on Reghaïa

The Emir Abdelkader organized on 8 May 1837 the attack in the region of Réghaïa on the farm named Mercier, installed in an agricultural concession adjoining the border of the Emirate of Abdelkader and consisting of the Oued Boudouaou also nicknamed Oued Keddara, and this, was to impose his yoke and reign on the edge of his state declared by the Treaty of Tafna.

The Emir knew that his allies in the Kabyle tribes of Khachna and Issers could mobilize up to six thousand (6000) men on foot and up to eight hundred (800) cavalry in the field to harass the French establishments beyond the current Boudouaou.

This is how the Emir, when he organized the attack on Réghaïa and the looting of French colonial farms, was guaranteed to have safe shelter with the marabouts of the Beni Aïcha, whose villages overlook Oued Meraldene and Oued Isser.

General Damrémont was taken aback in Algiers when he learned that the eastern suburbs of the Casbah of Algiers were in turmoil under the blows of untimely attacks by rebels affiliated with Emir Abdelkader.

The general then ordered Colonel Maximilien Joseph Schauenburg to prepare an expedition by land and sea to attack the relief and shelter of Emir Abdelkader among the Beni Aïcha to dislodge this nebula made up of dozens of villages which were stationed not far from Algiers.

Intrusion among the Beni Aïcha

The strategy that followed consisted having General Pérregaux disembark from his boat with about a thousand infantry and cannon on the shore of the Beni Aïcha in order to ambush and wait for the Kabyle rebels fleeing the battle of Colonel Schauenburg to the north of Meraldene ravine by rising through the villages of Boukhanfar and Talamali, in order to decimate and annihilate them.

The bad weather which suddenly occurred on the  threw away this well-established plan because General Pérregaux was held up by the stormy storm and could not get his boat out of the harbor of the port of Algiers.

Despite the bad weather that had fallen in the middle of May 1837 on Mitidja and Kabylia, Colonel Schauenburg left on the night of 17 May 1837 from his camp in Réghaïa to descend towards the ravine of Oued Boudouaou on which he had assembled a military column of two thousand men to attack the Beni Aïcha.

Colonel Schauenburg was held back with his thousands of soldiers by rain and wind in his sustained night march before reaching the Meraldene ravine only at eight in the morning of the next day 18 May 1837, where groups of Kabyles awaited him to counter it and to hinder its advance in Kabylia if it managed to cross the bed of Oued Isser.

As the Kabyles were driven back towards the descent of the villages of Baloul and Tebabkha near the course of Oued Isser on the long defile of the eastern flank of the Khachna massif, the other villages folded up on the heights and entered in line in the confrontation with the regiment infantry which then suffered some human losses in its ranks.

A chase then began between the Kabyle insurgents and the French soldiers to take control of this unique opening between Mitidja and Kabylia, since a large reinforcement came running from Laazib Zamoum to reinforce the Beni Aïcha in their brave resistance on an ancestral land which was favorable and advantageous to them on all levels.

Ben Zamoum counterattack

After the soldiers of Colonel Schauenburg'''s military column were scattered near Oued Isser during the day of 18 May 1837, an order was given to them to gather their elongated ranks into a reformed group.

Cheikh Ben Zamoum then came from the  region with about two thousand (2,000) Algerians to stop Colonel Schauenburg's advance towards his territory if the Beni Aïcha region failed in blocking the advance of the French invaders.

But the French prevented this attack of the Kabyle by knocking them down and frightening them vigorously, then the infantry and spahis moved towards the northern shore while deploying skirmishers in the distance on the sides of the mountains to protect them from the pursuit and the stalking Algerians.Schauenburg ordered to quickly drive out the surprised populations with their herds to accost them on the beach of Oued Merdja where no disembarkation had taken place because of the showers and hail, and this is how the Kabyle men and animals arrived at escape from the trap and the bee-eater that had been given to them.

Turning back

The expeditionary operation of 1837 against the Beni Aïcha was missed by Colonel Schauenburg because of the lack of time and the determination of the Kabyles to defend their families, their villages and their land, and with the backing of the insurgents of the Beni Aïcha by their brothers of Iflissen arriving from Laazib Zamoum.Schauenburg realized that a longer stay in the country of the Beni Aïcha insurgents would attract him, without good possible result since Kabyles'' reinforcements and forces was greater than the strength of his military column, hence his announced and planned defeat.

This colonel brought back the next day 19 May 1837 by a very strong march his expeditionary force towards his initial camp between Boudouaou and Réghaïa.

Gallery

See also
 Emir Abdelkader
 Emirate of Abdelkader
 Igawawen
 French conquest of Algeria
 First Battle of Boudouaou
 List of French governors of Algeria
 Charles-Marie Denys de Damrémont
 Maximilien Joseph Schauenburg
 Alexandre Charles Perrégaux
 Antoine de La Torré

External links

Bibliography

References

Conflicts in 1837
1837 in Algeria
Battles involving Algeria
Battles involving France
May 1837 events
1830s in Algeria
Military history of Algeria
French colonial empire
Invasions by France
19th century in Algeria
Algerian War
Rebellions in Africa
Wars involving the states and peoples of Africa
Wars of independence
Thénia